The Lithuanian Cycling Federation or LDSF is the national governing body of cycle racing in Lithuania.

The LDSF is a member of the UCI and the UEC.

External links
 Lithuanian Cycling Federation official website

National members of the European Cycling Union
Cycle racing organizations
Cycling
Cycling